Laminopora is a genus of bryozoans belonging to the family Adeonidae.

The species of this genus are found in South America and South Australia.

Species:

Laminopora bimunita 
Laminopora contorta 
Laminopora dispar 
Laminopora jellyae 
Laminopora miocenica

References

Bryozoan genera